Muhammad Jailani bin Khamis is a Malaysian politician who has served as Member of the Melaka State Executive Council (EXCO) in the Barisan Nasional (BN) state administration under Chief Minister Sulaiman Md Ali since March 2020 for the second term and under former Chief Minister Adly Zahari from May 2018 to the collapse of the Pakatan Harapan (PH) state administration in March 2020 for the first term. He has also served as Member of the Melaka State Legislative Assembly (MLA) for Rembia since May 2018. He is a member of the United Malays National Organisation (UMNO), a component party of the ruling Barisan Nasional (BN) coalition.  He was a member People's Justice Party (PKR), a component party of Pakatan Harapan (PH) coalition before switching to be an independent supporting the ruling BN coalition for nine months.    

In November 2019, he and Ginie Lim Siew Lin from Machap Jaya were absent in the state assembly and had allowed a motion from the then ruling PH coalition to propose Melaka PKR chairman Halim Bachik as a Senator to be defeated.  PH leader and PKR president Anwar Ibrahim had met them over their action which was deemed 'unacceptable'. 

Jailani instead left PKR to join UMNO in 2021, and was picked by the party as the BN candidate to defend the Rembia seat in the subsequent 2021 state election, he managed to retain it.

Election results

Honours

Honours of Malaysia
  :
  Companion Class I of the Order of Malacca (DMSM) – Datuk (2018)

References

External links
 

1972 births
Living people
People from Malacca
Malaysian people of Malay descent
Malaysian Muslims
Independent politicians in Malaysia
Former People's Justice Party (Malaysia) politicians
United Malays National Organisation politicians
Members of the Malacca State Legislative Assembly
Malacca state executive councillors
21st-century Malaysian politicians